Lemma may refer to:

Language and linguistics
 Lemma (morphology), the canonical, dictionary or citation form of a word
 Lemma (psycholinguistics), a mental abstraction of a word about to be uttered

Science and mathematics
 Lemma (botany), a part of a grass plant
 Lemma (mathematics), a type of proposition

Other uses
 Lemma (album), by John Zorn (2013)
 Lemma (logic), an informal contention

See also
Analemma, a diagram showing the variation of the position of the Sun in the sky
Dilemma
Lema (disambiguation)
 Lemmatisation 
Neurolemma, part of a neuron